Mehbooba Mufti ministry  was sworn in as Chief Minister of Jammu and Kashmir on 4 April 2016. The list of ministers:

Cabinet ministers

From Peoples Democratic Party 

 Mehbooba Mufti - Chief Minister
 Abdul Rehman Veeri - Minister for Public Works and Parliamentary Affairs
 Ghulam Nabi Lone - Minister for Agriculture Production
Abdul Haq Khan - Minister for Rural Development & Panchayati Raj and Law & Justice
Chowdhary Zulfkar Ali- Minister for Department of Food, Civil Supplies and Consumer Affairs
 Haseeb Drabu - Minister for Finance, Culture and Labour & Employment
Syed Basharat Ahmed Bukhari - Minister for Revenue, Disaster Management, Relief, Rehabilitation and Reconstruction
 Naeem Akhtar - Minister for Education
 Imran Raza Ansari - Minister for Information Technology, Technical Education and Youth Services & Sports
 Altaf Bukhari - Minister for education and finance

From Bharatiya Janata Party

 Dr. Nirmal Singh - Deputy Chief Minister & Minister for Power Development and Housing and Urban Development
 Chander Prakash (politician)- Minister for Industries and Commerce
Bali Bhagat - Minister for Health and Medical Education
Lal Singh - Minister for Forest, Ecology & Environment
 Chering Dorje - Minister for Cooperatives and Ladakh Affairs
 Abdul Gani Kohli - Minister for Animal, Sheep Husbandry and Fisheries
 Sham Lal Choudhary - Minister for PHE, Irrigation and Flood Control

From Jammu and Kashmir People's Conference

 Sajjad Lone - Minister for Social Welfare, ARI & Trainings and Science & Technology

Ministers of state

From PDP

 Asiya Naqash - Minister of State for Housing & Urban Development Social Welfare, Health & Medical Education
 Farooq Ahmad Andrabi - Minister of State for Haj & Auqaf (Independent charge), PHE and Irrigation & Flood Control, Power Development, Industries & Commerce
 Zahoor Ahmad Mir - Minister of State for Forest, Ecology and Environment, Animal & Sheep Husbandry, Cooperative and Fisheries

From BJP

 Sunil Kumar Sharma - Minister of State for Transport (Independent charge), Revenue, Public Works (Roads & Buildings), Rural Development & Panchayati Raj, Agriculture Production, YSS
 Priya Sethi - Minister of State for Education, Technical Education, Culture, Tourism, Department of Horticulture, Floriculture and Parks
 Ajay Nanda  - Minister of State for Finance and Planning, Information Technology, Law, Justice and Parliamentary Affairs, CA and PD, Tribal Affairs, Relief & Rehabilitation and L&Emp

See also 

 First Mufti Mohammad Sayeed ministry
 Second Mufti Mohammad Sayeed ministry
 Omar Abdullah ministry
 Ghulam Nabi Azad ministry

References

2016 in Indian politics
Jammu and Kashmir Peoples Democratic Party
Jammu and Kashmir ministries
Jammu and Kashmir People's Conference
2016 establishments in Jammu and Kashmir
2018 disestablishments in India
Cabinets established in 2016
Cabinets disestablished in 2018
Bharatiya Janata Party